Christopher Philip Coleman (born 1 June 1980) is a former English cricketer. Coleman was a right-handed batsman who played primarily as a wicketkeeper. He was born at Ashford, Surrey.

Coleman represented the Middlesex Cricket Board in a single List A match against Cambridgeshire in the 2nd round of the 2003 Cheltenham & Gloucester Trophy which was held in 2002. In his only List A match he scored an unbeaten 4 runs. Behind the stumps he took a single catch.

References

External links
Christopher Coleman at Cricinfo
Christopher Coleman at CricketArchive

1980 births
Living people
Cricketers from Surrey
English cricketers
Middlesex Cricket Board cricketers
People from Ashford, Surrey
Wicket-keepers